Quechultenango is one of the 81 municipalities of Guerrero, in south-western Mexico. The municipal seat lies at Quechultenango.  The municipality covers an area of 929.7 km².

As of 2005, the municipality had a total population of 33,367.

References

Municipalities of Guerrero